Corsi Sandro from the CESI SpA, Castellanza, Varese, Italy was named Fellow of the Institute of Electrical and Electronics Engineers (IEEE) in 2013 for contributions to wide-area voltage and reactive power regulation and protection.

References

Fellow Members of the IEEE
Living people
Year of birth missing (living people)
Place of birth missing (living people)